White Heat is the self titled debut album of future Switch members Gregory Williams, Bobby DeBarge and Jody Sims.  The album was released in 1975 and produced by R&B notable Barry White.

Track listing

Side A
"Take a Look at Yourself (Before You Frown on Someone Else)"
"If That's the Way You Feel (Then Let's Fall in Love)"
"I Love Every Little Thing About You" originally performed by Stevie Wonder
"Talkin'"

Side B
"What a Groove"
"I've Been So Lonely (Without You)"
"You Can Change My Life For Me"
"Funk Freak"

References

1975 debut albums
RCA Records albums